Mountain Men is an American reality television series on the History channel that premiered on May 31, 2012.

Synopsis
Eustace Conway resides on a parcel of land in the Blue Ridge Mountains of North Carolina that he calls Turtle Island. There, he hosts people to whom he teaches basic wilderness survival skills. Additionally, he earns an income using ancient techniques to harvest firewood. Threatened by a lien against his land, Conway fights to maintain ownership. His friend Preston Roberts would frequently appear on the show.

Marty Meierotto resides in the small Alaskan town of Two Rivers with his wife Dominique and daughter Noah. Once a month Marty flies his Piper PA-18A-150 Super Cub aircraft with tundra tires to his cabin on the Draanjik River in the Alaska North Slope. While there, he uses a snowmobile to tend to his animal traps that he uses to collect furs.

Tom Oar, a former rodeo cowboy, resides near the Yaak River in northwestern Montana with his wife Nancy and their dog Ellie.  Facing a seven-month winter season, the pair work hard, with the help of their neighbors, to prepare. Tom is an accomplished tanner of game animal pelts using natural Native American methods.

Rich Lewis, a mountain lion hunter, resides in Montana's Ruby Valley with his wife Diane. He pursues his passion for tracking mountain lions there with the help of a team of hounds. During season 6 he said he was getting too old to be doing this. He did not return for season 7.

George Michaud, a fur trapper, camps along the Snake River and Teton Range in Idaho.

Charlie Tucker, a fur trapper, resides near Great North Woods in Ashland, Maine. He often partners with Jim Dumond.

Kyle Bell, a game hunter and outfitter by trade, runs his hunts over 45,000 acres of rugged landscape and resides in New Mexico's Cimarron Valley with his ten-year-old son, Ben.

Morgan Beasley resides in the Alaska Range with his partner Margaret Stern. Both are licensed bush pilots.

Jason Hawk lives with his family near The Ozarks in Arkansas. He is a master blacksmith and owner of Jason Hawk's Outlaw Forge Works.

Preston Roberts died from complications due to cancer at age 60 on July 24, 2017. His son Joseph Roberts appears in several episodes in the seasons following Preston's death.

Jake Herak, a mountain lion hunter, resides in Montana's Tobacco Root Mountains.

Mike Horstman, a bear hunting guide, resides on Kodiak Island in Alaska with his dog Adele.

Josh Kirk, a ranch manager and game hunter, resides in Wyoming's Wind River Range with his wife Bonnie and their daughter, Eden.

The Youren Brothers, Kidd and Harry, professionally serve as cattle ranchers and game hunters in Idaho's Sawtooth Wilderness.

Cast
Eustace Conway (season 1–present)
Marty Meierotto (seasons 1–8)
Tom Oar (seasons 1–present)
Charlie Tucker (seasons 2–3)
George Michaud (season 2)
Rich Lewis (seasons 2–6)
Kyle Bell (seasons 3–4)
Morgan Beasley  (seasons 4–8)
Jason Hawk (seasons 5–9)
Brent Jameson (season 6)
Margaret Stern   (seasons 6–8)
Jake Herak (season 7–present)
Mike Horstman  (season 7–present)
Harry Youren (season 8–present)
Kidd Youren (season 8–present)
Josh Kirk (season 9–present)
Martha Tansy (season 10-present)

Episodes

References

2010s American reality television series
2012 American television series debuts
History (American TV channel) original programming
English-language television shows

External links